Manuel Pérez Vila (3 September 1922 in Girona, Spain – 8 May 1991 in Caracas, Venezuela) was a Venezuelan historian and professor.

Bibliography 
Una biografía de José Rafael Revenga (1953)
Vida de Daniel Florencio O'Leary, primer edecán del Libertador (1957)
Las campañas periodísticas del Libertador (1968)
La Caricatura Política En El Siglo XIX (1979)
Para acercarnos a Bolívar (1980)

See also 
List of Venezuelan writers

References

1922 births
1991 deaths
20th-century Venezuelan historians
Venezuelan male writers
Academic staff of the Central University of Venezuela
Spanish emigrants to Venezuela
20th-century male writers